The 1970 Saskatchewan Roughriders finished in 1st place in the Western Conference with a 14–2–0 record, which still stands as a franchise record for most wins in a single season. The team's winning percentage of 0.875 is also the best since the creation of the Western Interprovincial Football Union in 1936. The Roughriders qualified for the playoffs for the ninth straight season, but lost the West Final three-game series to the Calgary Stampeders. Between regular season and playoffs, Saskatchewan lost only three times at home, all to Calgary, including twice in their playoff series.

Regular season

Season Standings

Season schedule

Postseason

Schedule

References

Saskatchewan Roughriders seasons
1970 Canadian Football League season by team